Claudius Ash (1792–1854) was an English goldsmith and dental manufacturer.

Personal life
The second son of Sarjeant Ash (1754–1820) and Lydia Ash née Smith, Claudius Ash was born in Bethnal Green, London, on 2 March 1792. He married Sarah Butler on 11 March 1813 and had eight children, four of whom, along with other members of the Ash family and their descendants, were engaged in dental manufacturing or practised as dental surgeons. Claudius Ash’s family were members of the Catholic Apostolic Church (Irvingites). He died in London on 3 November 1854.

Work

Claudius Ash followed his father into the profession of silversmithing and goldsmithing in the firm of Ash & Sons, 64 St James’s Street, Westminster. In about 1820 he was asked to apply his craftsmanship to making a set of dentures. Up to this time, the majority of false teeth were made from hippopotamus or walrus ivory that was prone to discolouring, or from human teeth extracted from dead bodies, including battlefield casualties (thus known as ‘Waterloo teeth’). Ash’s teeth, made of porcelain mounted on gold plates, with gold springs and swivels, were considered superior both aesthetically and functionally and laid the foundation of his new enterprise as Britain’s foremost manufacturer of dentures and dental appliances. Originally based in Broad Street (now Broadwick Street), London, the business expanded rapidly and by the mid-nineteenth century Claudius Ash dentures and dental equipment dominated the European market. Claudius Ash & Sons became an international company, in 1924 merging with de Trey & Company to form the Amalgamated Dental Company; it is now a division of Plandent Limited.

Further reading
 A Catalogue of Artificial Teeth and Dental Materials Manufactured and Sold by Claudius Ash & Sons, 7, 8, & 9, Broad Street, Golden Square, London, 1865, Landkirchen: Pelican Publishing, 2000 (facsimile)
 Claudius Ash Sons & Co Ltd, A Century of Dental Art: A Centenary Memoir, 1820–1921, 1921
 Elisabeth Bennion, Antique Dental Instruments, London: Sotheby’s Publications, 1986
 Maurice David Kaufman Bremner, The Story of Dentistry, Brooklyn: Dental Items of Interest Publishing Company, 1946
 Sydney Garfield, Teeth Teeth Teeth, London: Arlington Books, 1972
 John Woodforde, The Strange Story of False Teeth, London: Routledge & Kegan Paul, 1968

Notes

External links
 Ash of Cannock (Ash family history website; currently offline – refer enquiries regarding Ash family history to Russell Ash )
 Oxford Dictionary of National Biography entry on Claudius Ash by Timothy Blatchford (subscription required for online access)

1792 births
1854 deaths
English goldsmiths
English silversmiths
People from Bethnal Green